Claver Kamanya (born 25 March 1947) is a Tanzanian former athlete who specialised in sprinting events. Born in Bukoba, he represented Tanzania at two Olympic Games and won a bronze medal in the 400 metres at the 1974 British Commonwealth Games.

At the 1968 Summer Olympics he competed in the 400 metres and set his personal best time, 45.74, in the opening heats of the competition, which remains a national record. He was eliminated in the semi-finals stage after placing seventh.

Kamanya was Tanzania's flag bearer at the 1972 Summer Olympics where in addition to the 400 metres he competed in relays events. A quarter-finalist in the individual 400 metres, he raced in the heats for Tanzania in the 4 x 100 and 4 x 400 relays.

References

External links
Claver Kamanya at Sports Reference

1947 births
Living people
Tanzanian male athletes
Olympic athletes of Tanzania
Athletes (track and field) at the 1968 Summer Olympics
Athletes (track and field) at the 1972 Summer Olympics
Commonwealth Games bronze medallists for Tanzania
Commonwealth Games medallists in athletics
Athletes (track and field) at the 1970 British Commonwealth Games
Athletes (track and field) at the 1974 British Commonwealth Games
People from Bukoba
Medallists at the 1974 British Commonwealth Games